Vostok is a rural locality (a selo) and the administrative center of Vostochinsky Selsoviet of Yenotayevsky District, Astrakhan Oblast, Russia. The population was 1,276 as of 2010. There are 11 streets.

Geography 
Vostok is located 21 km southeast of Yenotayevka (the district's administrative centre) by road. Kosika is the nearest rural locality.

References 

Rural localities in Yenotayevsky District